Kailash Chandra Meher (born 22 January 1954) is an Indian artist, inventor, and social activist. He is a painter of contemporary modern art paintings and traditional Tussar Pattachitra paintings of Odisha. He was a recipient of the Padma Shri by the Government of India in 2013.

Personal life and education
Meher was born in an artist family in Sonepur town of Odisha state. He studied at Visva-Bharati University, Santiniketan and received a Diploma in Fine Arts from the Visva-Bharati University, Shantiniketan in West Bengal. He was trained in the art of Pattachitra painting initially by his father and subsequently under guidance of Bhagwat Maharana.

His wife Smt. Laxmi Meher and daughter Manisha jointly received National award in 2005. Smt Meher had also received state award in 1990 while daughter Manisha got two state awards in 2001–2002. Both his sons Prakash and Jayanta got National Award in 2001.

Career
Meher worked as an art designer in the Weavers Service Centre in Bhubaneswar, Govt. Of India, under Development Commissioner Handloom, New Delhi from 1978 to 1993 creating textile designs for weavers and weaving organisations, and developed some old Bomkai designs, which were developed into a product called "Bomkai Sari".

Meher creates new designs, techniques with research and experiments, aiming for better market promotion in India and abroad. His tree paintings were presented as an example for the Shilp Guru award. Because of his excellent work in paintings, many more students and followers got National Award and also thousands of artisan families survive their livelihood by following his innovative creative designs & paintings for their bread & butter.

For the poorest girls & women of KBK district, he has started many social organisations with the help and support of The Collector (District Magistrate) for giving them training & employment, so he started some Handloom, Handicraft & Fine Art organisation like :- 1. Indian Art & Craft Academy for Women 2. Indira Gandhi Women Weavers Co-operative Society limited 3. Bharatiya Hastakala Industrial Co-operative Society Limited 4. Handicraft & Handloom Museum and Service Centre for Women.

Awards
 1979 & 1985 – Orissa Lalit Kala Academy Award
 1986 – "National Award" by HE the President of India
 1997 – Viswakarma Award  
 1991 & 2001 – "Kalamani" Award by Chief Minister of Haryana    
 2005 – UNESCO CCI seal of excellence for handicrafts 
 2009 – Shilp Guru Award by HE the President of India
 2013 – Padma Shri Award by Govt. of India
 2013 – "Odisha Living Legend Award" by Odisha Diary

Selected paintings

References 

1954 births
Living people
Recipients of the Padma Shri in arts
20th-century Indian painters
People from Balangir
Indian male painters
21st-century Indian painters
Painters from Odisha
20th-century Indian male artists
21st-century Indian male artists